The Trinidad and Tobago Carnival is an annual event held on the Monday and Tuesday before Ash Wednesday in Trinidad and Tobago. This event is well known for participants' colorful costumes and exuberant celebrations. There are numerous cultural events such as "band launch fetes" running in the lead up to the street parade on Carnival Monday and Tuesday. It is said that if the islanders are not celebrating it, then they are preparing for it, while reminiscing about the past year's festival. Traditionally, the festival is associated with soca music, with its origins formulated in the midst of hardship for enslaved West and Central Africans; however, recently Soca music has replaced calypso as the most celebrated type of music. Costumes (sometimes called "mas"), stick-fighting and limbo competitions are also important components of the festival.

Carnival, as it is celebrated in Trinidad and Tobago, is also celebrated in several cities worldwide.  These celebrations include Toronto's Caribana, Miami's Miami Carnival, Houston Carifest, London's Notting Hill Carnival, as well as New York City's Labor Day Carnival.

Origin
The Mas tradition started in the late 18th century with French plantation owners organizing masquerades (mas) and balls before enduring the fasting of Lent. The slaves, who could not take part in Carnival, formed their own, parallel celebration called "Canboulay". Canboulay (from the French cannes brulés, meaning burnt cane) is a precursor to Trinidad and Tobago Carnival, and has played an important role in the development of the music of Trinidad and Tobago.

Calypso music was developed in Trinidad in the 17th century from the West African Kaiso and canboulay music brought by African slaves imported to that Caribbean island to work on sugar plantations. These slaves, brought to toil on sugar plantations, were stripped of all connections to their homeland and family and not allowed to talk to each other. They used calypso to mock the slave masters and to communicate with each other. Many early calypsos were sung in French Creole by an individual called a griot. As calypso developed, the role of the griot became known as a chantuelle and eventually, calypsonian.

Steelpan

Stick fighting and African percussion music were banned in 1881, in response to the Canboulay Riots. They were replaced by bamboo "Bamboo-Tamboo" sticks beaten together, which were themselves banned in turn. In 1937 they reappeared, transformed as an orchestra of frying pans, dustbin lids and oil drums. These steelpans (or pans) are now a major part of the Trinidadian music scene and are a popular section of the Canboulay music contests. In 1941, the United States Navy arrived on Trinidad, and the panmen, who were associated with lawlessness and violence, helped to popularize steel pan music among soldiers, which began its international popularization.

J'Ouvert

J'ouvert (translated from French as "break of day"), symbolizes the start of the official two days of Carnival. Beginning early Monday, revellers parade through town in the tradition of the Canboulay celebrations.  Jouvay, as it is commonly known, features a variety of homemade or satirical costumes.  This celebration involves participants dousing themselves in oil, mud and powder while they dance to calypso music through the streets. This is a stark contrast to the attractive and more formal costumes that are donned later in the day on Carnival Monday and on Tuesday.

Carnival dates 
The table shows a list of Trinidad and Tobago Carnival dates from 2009 to 2026.

The 2021 edition of the event - scheduled for February 15 and 16 2021 - has been cancelled due to the COVID-19 pandemic

Characters 

A few specific characters have evolved during the history of Trinidad and Tobago's Carnival. Among these characters are:

 Burrokeet – A "donkey-man" character constructed so as to give the illusion of a dancer riding a small burro or donkey. This masquerade was brought to Trinidad by Venezuelan settlers.
 Dame Lorraine – An ample voluptuous woman. The costume parodies the dress of 18th-century French aristocratic women and is stuffed in the hips and bust.
 Jab Jab – The name comes from the French Patois word for devil.
 Midnight Robber – A character who brags about himself and whose costume is influenced by American Cowboy clothes.
 Minstrels – A group of singers
 Moko jumbie - A stilt dancer. The character is of African origin. Originally the character wore a hat made of dried wild cucumbers, and the stilts were striped.
 Pierrot – ''A well-dressed character that prides himself on his knowledge

References

External links 

 Official Trinidad and Tobago Tourism Site – www.gotrinidadandtobago.com
 Calendar of Events at the Trinidad Tourism Site
 National Carnival Commission Official Website
 History and Carnival Information at the National Library
 
 The Birth & Evolution of Trinidad Carnival

Trinidad and Tobago culture
Music festivals in the Caribbean
Annual events in Trinidad and Tobago
Carnivals in Trinidad and Tobago
Winter events in Trinidad and Tobago
Folk festivals in Trinidad and Tobago